Parattu Raveendran Sreejesh is an Indian professional field hockey player who plays as a goalkeeper and former captain of the Indian national team. He plays in the Hockey India League for Uttar Pradesh Wizards. Sreejesh played a vital role in the Indian national team's bronze medal win at the 2020 Summer Olympics men's field hockey tournament.
He won FIH Player of the Year Awards (2020–21) for best male goalkeeper.

Early life 
Sreejesh was born 8 May 1988, in Kizhakkambalam village, in the Ernakulam district of Kerala, to P. V. Raveendran and Usha, a family of farmers. He completed his primary education in St. Antony's Lower Primary School in Kizhakkambalam and he studied until the sixth standard in St. Joseph's High School in Kizhakkambalam.

As a kid, he trained as a sprinter, before moving on to long jump and volleyball. At 12, he joined the GV Raja Sports School in Thiruvananthapuram. This was where his coach suggested that he take up goalkeeping. He became a professional after he was picked by hockey coach Jayakumar at the school, following which he played at the school before playing at the Nehru Cup. He completed his graduation in History from Sree Narayana College, Kollam, Kerala.

In 2017, the Government of India awarded him the fourth highest civilian award Padma Shri for his work in the field of sports.

Career

International career 
Sreejesh made the Junior national team in 2004, in a match against Australia in Perth, in 2004. He made his debut in the senior national team in 2006, at the South Asian Games in Colombo. Following India's win at the 2008 Junior Asia Cup, he was awarded the 'Best Goalkeeper of the Tournament'. Having been a part of the Indian team for six years, though often losing his place to senior goalkeepers, Adrian D'Souza and Bharat Chettri, he has been a regular member since 2011, after saving two penalty stroke in the Asian Champions Trophy Final in Ordos City, China, against Pakistan, a match-winning performance. His second 'Best Goalkeeper of the Tournament' award came at the 2013 Asia Cup, with India finishing second in the tournament. He was a part of the team that won silver medals at the

Sreejesh had earlier played for India at the 2012 Summer Olympics in London, and then World Cup in 2014. At the 2014 Asian Games in Incheon, South Korea, he starred in Indian's gold medal win, when he saved two penalty strokes against Pakistan in the final. At the 2014 Champions Trophy and 2018 Champions Trophy, he was adjudged "Goalkeeper of the Tournament". Following impressive performances in 2014, he was nominated for the award of Best Male Goalkeeper; he eventually lost to Jaap Stockmann of the Netherlands. He was the captain of the team that won the silver medal at the 2016 Men's Hockey Champions Trophy held at London.

On 13 Jul 2016, Sreejesh was given the responsibilities of the Captain of the Indian hockey team, taking over from Sardar Singh.

At the 2016 Olympics in Rio, Sreejesh led the Indian hockey team to the quarterfinals of the tournament .

At the Tokyo Olympics, on 5 August 2021, Sreejesh played a key role in defeating Germany to clinch the bronze medal for India after 41 years.

Sreejesh is in race for World games Athlete of the year and according to the reports, the online voting will start from 10 January 2022 and ends at 31 January 2022.

Club career 
At the auction of the inaugural season of the Hockey India League, Sreejesh was bought by the Mumbai franchise for 38,000. He played two seasons for their team, Mumbai Magicians. In 2014, he was bought by Uttar Pradesh Wizards for 69,000 and since the 2015 season, has been playing for them. PR Sreejesh became the second Indian to win the "World Athlete of the Year" after Rani Rampal.

Personal life 
Sreejesh married his longtime girlfriend Aneeshya, a former long jumper and an Ayurveda doctor. They have a daughter (b. 2014) Anusree. His son, Sreeansh was born in 2017. He is currently employed as Chief Sports Organiser with the Government of Kerala's Department of General and Higher Education. Sreejesh is a member of Rotary Club of Kizhakkambalam, District 3201.

Awards 
 2021 – Khel Ratna Award, highest sporting honour of India.
 2022- "World Athlele Of The Year 2021".

References

External links 
 Sreejesh Ravindran at Hockey India
 
 

1988 births
Living people
Sportspeople from Kochi
Field hockey players from Kerala
Indian male field hockey players
Male field hockey goalkeepers
World Series Hockey players
Field hockey players at the 2012 Summer Olympics
Field hockey players at the 2016 Summer Olympics
Field hockey players at the 2020 Summer Olympics
2010 Men's Hockey World Cup players
2014 Men's Hockey World Cup players
2018 Men's Hockey World Cup players
Olympic field hockey players of India
Field hockey players at the 2014 Commonwealth Games
Field hockey players at the 2018 Commonwealth Games
Field hockey players at the 2022 Commonwealth Games
Commonwealth Games silver medallists for India
Commonwealth Games medallists in field hockey
Field hockey players at the 2014 Asian Games
Field hockey players at the 2018 Asian Games
Asian Games gold medalists for India
Asian Games bronze medalists for India
Asian Games medalists in field hockey
Medalists at the 2014 Asian Games
Medalists at the 2018 Asian Games
Recipients of the Padma Shri in sports
Recipients of the Arjuna Award
Olympic bronze medalists for India
Medalists at the 2020 Summer Olympics
Olympic medalists in field hockey
Recipients of the Khel Ratna Award
2023 Men's FIH Hockey World Cup players
Medallists at the 2022 Commonwealth Games